Polish–Turkish relations are the foreign relations between Poland and Turkey. Both countries are full members of NATO, OECD, OSCE, the Union for the Mediterranean, the Council of Europe and the World Trade Organisation. Poland and Turkey share many similarities in their cultural history and cuisine and generally relations are cordial.
Poland is a member of the European Union, Turkey is not a member.

History

Polish-Turkish relations have been historically close yet complex. Historically, the Polish–Lithuanian Commonwealth had a direct border with the Ottoman Empire, both states had a tumultuous history being in open and consistent warfare between one another for centuries, particularly in the southeastern borderlands of the Polish–Lithuanian Commonwealth around Moldavia, modern-day Ukraine, Romania and Crimea. Troops from the Kingdom of Poland were part of a large European coalition that tried to repel the Ottoman invasion of Europe at the Battle of Nicopolis in 1396. Warfare between both states began in 1443 with the Crusade of Varna. Further wars were fought in 1485–1503, 1620-1621, 1633–1634, 1672–1676, and 1683–1699, and the Poles and Turks also clashed in the Moldavian Magnate Wars. During the wars, sections of the Polish–Lithuanian Commonwealth fell under the direct administration of the Ottoman Empire under the Podolia Eyalet or Silistra Eyalet for some time. The victory of Polish-led forces at the Battle of Vienna in 1683 marked the end of Ottoman advances into Europe.

Diplomatic relations between the Ottoman Empire and the Polish–Lithuanian Commonwealth were established in the 15th century. In 2013, Poland and Turkey celebrated 600 years of diplomatic relations.

Turkish support for the Polish Bar Confederation against Russia sparked the Russo-Turkish War of 1768–1774. Following the Partitions of Poland, the Ottoman Empire and Qajar Iran were the only major countries in the world that did not recognise the final partition of the Polish–Lithuanian Commonwealth.  An anecdote exists recounting the exchange between the chef de protocol and his aide of the Ottoman Empire which is widely recounted today in Poland. According to the tale, whenever the diplomatic corps was received by the Ottoman sultan, on the sight of the empty chair of the Polish deputy, the Ottoman chef de protocol would ostentatiously ask: “Where is the deputy from Lehistan?”. On each occasion he would receive the same reply from his aide: ‘Your Excellency, the deputy of Lehistan could not make it because of vital impediments’ to the annoyance of the diplomats from the partitioning states. The first written record of this story comes from the Polish ambassador to Turkey in the years 1936 – 45, Michał Sokolnicki (1880 – 1967). He heard it from a Turkish officer and statesman, Ali Fuat Cebesoy (1880 – 1968), who was acquainted with the Istanbul Polish community. Cebesoy claimed that this symbolic exchange continued until the end of the sultanate and he witnessed it in person as a young officer during the reign of Sultan Abdülhamid II (r. 1876 – 1909) 

In the 19th century, many Polish veterans of the November Uprising, January Uprising, and Crimean War arrived in Turkey. Polish officers, such as Michał Czajkowski, served in the Ottoman Army. Polish General Marian Langiewicz spent the last years of his life in Turkey, fought in the Ottoman Army, and died in Istanbul, where he is buried at the Haydarpaşa Cemetery. Polish national poet Adam Mickiewicz spent the last months of his life in Istanbul and died there. The house where he lived was later transformed into the Adam Mickiewicz Museum. In 1877, the Polish Legion in Turkey was formed and it fought alongside Turks in the Russo-Turkish War of 1877–1878.

The village of Polonezköy (Adampol), which lies on the Anatolian side of Istanbul, was first settled in 1842 by Polish veterans of the November Uprising. Further Polish settlers arrived in the 19th and 20th centuries. As of 2009, there is still a Polish minority in the village.

During the German-Soviet invasion of Poland, which started World War II in 1939, Turkish authorities agreed to transport evacuated Polish gold through Turkish territory to Polish-allied France.

Recent relations 

Although Turkey and Poland enjoy cordial relations, in recent times the relationship between the two sometimes goes tense. Poland was one of the main countries that condemned the Turkish invasion of Cyprus and affirmed its stance for a united Cyprus. Moreover, in 2005, Poland officially recognized the Armenian genocide, which resulted in Turkey withdrawing its ambassador for a month resulting in a diplomatic clash.

Poland has expressed views that Russia is a threat to its national sovereignty and has been very critical of Russian meddling in foreign affairs in the Middle East and the former states of the Soviet Union. Thus, Poland has condemned Turkey's attempt of trying to get closer to Russia, such as buying the S-400 missile system as well as Turkey's deteriorating democracy. Nevertheless, Poland is one of the strongest supporters of Turkey's accession to the European Union.

April 18, 2010, the day of the state funeral of Lech and Maria Kaczyński, was declared a day of national mourning in Turkey to commemorate the 96 victims of the Smolensk air disaster, including Polish President Lech Kaczyński and his wife Maria Kaczyńska.

Since 2012, Poland, Turkey, and Romania have maintained regular contact within the Trilog format for close cooperation as the three largest countries on the eastern flank of NATO. Since 2021, a Polish military contingent has been stationed in Turkey as part of a NATO operation to help secure Turkey's borders.

Famous Turks with partial Polish ancestry include the poet and playwright Nâzım Hikmet, Ahmet Rüstem Bey, Fatoş Sezer, Hurrem Sultan, and the soprano opera singer Leyla Gencer.

Poland and Turkey co-hosted the 2019 Women's European Volleyball Championship.

In April 2021, Turkish Foreign Minister Mevlüt Çavuşoğlu described his country's relations with Poland as a "strategic partnership", noting warm historic ties and military cooperation.

In August 2021, Poland sent firefighters to help extinguish the 2021 Turkey wildfires.

In November 2021, Polish Prime Minister Mateusz Morawiecki accused Turkey of assisting Belarus and Russia during the 2021–2022 Belarus–European Union border crisis. Turkey subsequently temporarily blocked flights to Belarus to ease the crisis and expressed support for the Polish authorities.

In April 2022, Turkey granted visa-free travel to Polish nationals.

In February 2023, Poland sent 178 rescuers and medics to Turkey to help the relief operation after the 2023 earthquake, as well as material aid, including medical equipment, medicines, power generators, field beds, etc. Various Polish charitable organizations, including the Polish Red Cross, Caritas Polska and Polish Humanitarian Action, organized fundraising and material aid for the earthquake victims.

Resident diplomatic missions

 Poland has an embassy in Ankara and a consulate-general in Istanbul.
 Turkey has an embassy in Warsaw.

See also 
 Foreign relations of Poland 
 Foreign relations of Turkey
 Turkey–European Union relations 
 Turks in Poland 
 Turks in Europe

References

Further reading
 Urbanik, A. A., & Baylen, J. O. (1981). Polish Exiles and the Turkish Empire, 1830–1876. The Polish Review, 26(3), 43–53.

External links 
 Polish embassy in Ankara
 Turkish embassy in Warsaw
 Turkish Ministry of Foreign Affairs about relations with Poland
Polish–Turkish Relations: A Social–Political Analysis (MA thesis, Vienna University, written by Antonina Tausch)

 
Turkey
Poland